Hamilton is a town in Madison County, New York, United States. The population was 6,690 at the 2010 census. The town is named after American Founding Father Alexander Hamilton.

The Town of Hamilton contains a village also named Hamilton, the site of Colgate University. The village is on the county's border.

History 

The location was formerly called Payne's Corners. The Town of Hamilton was established in 1795, before the county was formed, from the Town of Paris in Oneida County. The original town was reduced to create new towns in the county.

Geography
The southern town line is the border of Chenango County.

According to the United States Census Bureau, the town has a total area of 41.4 square miles (107.3 km), of which 41.4 square miles (107.1 km) is land and 0.1 square mile (0.2 km) (0.19%) is water.

Demographics

At the 2000 census there were 5,733 people, 1,546 households, and 935 families in the town.  The population density was 138.6 people per square mile (53.5/km).  There were 1,725 housing units at an average density of 41.7 per square mile (16.1/km).  The racial makeup of the town was 93.65% White, 1.99% Black or African American, 0.07% Native American, 2.46% Asian, 0.03% Pacific Islander, 0.45% from other races, and 1.34% from two or more races. Hispanic or Latino of any race were 1.83%.

Of the 1,546 households 28.7% had children under the age of 18 living with them, 49.1% were married couples living together, 8.2% had a female householder with no husband present, and 39.5% were non-families. 29.6% of households were one person and 12.4% were one person aged 65 or older.  The average household size was 2.39 and the average family size was 2.96.

The age distribution was 15.7% under the age of 18, 40.8% from 18 to 24, 16.8% from 25 to 44, 15.8% from 45 to 64, and 11.0% 65 or older.  The median age was 22 years. For every 100 females, there were 88.9 males.  For every 100 females age 18 and over, there were 86.5 males.

The median household income was $38,917 and the median family income  was $50,565. Males had a median income of $31,500 versus $26,643 for females. The per capita income for the town was $15,564.  About 5.1% of families and 14.4% of the population were below the poverty line, including 10.4% of those under age 18 and 5.7% of those age 65 or over.

Communities and locations in Hamilton 
Beekman Corners – A location between Hamilton village and East Hamilton.
Brooks Corners – A hamlet in the south part of the town on Route 12.
Darts Corner – A location between Hamilton village and East Hamilton.
Earlville – Part of the Village of Earlville is located on the southern town line.
East Hamilton – A hamlet on Route 12, east of Hamilton village.
Excell Corners – A location northeast of South Hamilton.
Hamilton – The Village of Hamilton is in the northwestern part of the town.
Hamilton Center – A hamlet southeast of Hamilton village.
Hubbardsville – A hamlet north of East Hamilton village.
Loomis Corners – A location northwest of South Hamilton.
Poolville – A hamlet north of Brooks Corners.
Shores Corners – A location between Hamilton village and East Hamilton.
South Hamilton – A hamlet in the southeastern part of the town.

Notable people
John Vincent Atanasoff (1903-1995), inventor of the digital computer
Cordelia Throop Cole (1833–1900), social reformer

References

External links
  Official Town of Hamilton, NY Website
 Hamilton Public Library & Hamilton Historical Commission on New York Heritage Digital Collections
  Early Hamilton history
 Hamilton, from History of Madison County, State of New York by L. M. Hammond (Syracuse NY, 1872)

Syracuse metropolitan area
1795 establishments in New York (state)
Towns in Madison County, New York
Populated places established in 1795